Laura Hughes may refer to:
Laura Hughes (activist) (1886–1966), Canadian feminist
Laura Hughes (soccer) (born 2001), Australian footballer
Laura Hughes (weightlifter) (born 1993), Welsh weightlifter

See also
Laurie Hughes (1924–2011), English footballer